Vivo Participacoes  S.A. is a provider of cellular telecommunications services based in São Paulo, Brazil.  The company was formerly known as Telesp Celular Participacoes S.A. and is a subsidiary of Brasilcel N.V.

External links
 Yahoo profile

Telecommunications companies of Brazil
Companies formerly listed on the New York Stock Exchange
Holding companies of Brazil